The AN/SLQ-25 Nixie and its variants are towed torpedo decoys used on US and allied warships. It consists of a towed decoy device (TB-14A) and a shipboard signal generator. The decoy emits signals to draw a torpedo away from its intended target.

The Nixie attempts to defeat a torpedo's passive sonar by emitting simulated ship noise, such as propeller and engine noise, which is more attractive than the ship to the torpedo's sensors.

The AN/SLQ-25A Nixie is a clean-sheet design when compared to the AN/SLQ-25 Nixie. Apart from a few minor mechanical components, they share no common parts. The AN/SLQ-25A utilises a fiber optic tow cable (FOTC) and a 10-horsepower RL-272C double drum winch. Several engineering changes resulted in COTS equipment being utilised extensively in the system. A diagnostic program can be initiated locally or from the remote control station, and tests all electronic functions.

The AN/SLQ-25B includes equipment of the AN/SLQ-25A and incorporates a towed array sensor to detect submarines and incoming torpedoes.  The AN/SLQ-25B also incorporates additional active sonar decoys by receiving, amplifying, and returning "pings" from the torpedo, presenting a larger false target to the torpedo.

The AN/SLQ-25C System is an upgrade to the AN/SLQ-25A system. The AN/SLQ-25C incorporates improved surface ship torpedo countermeasures with the addition of new countermeasure modes along a longer, more functional tow cable.

Typically, larger ships may have two Nixie systems mounted at the stern of the ship to allow operation singularly or in pairs while smaller ships may have only one system.

Under a joint UK/ US Memorandum of understanding, the UK MoD and the US DoD are furthering torpedo survivability systems. The US is currently working on an Active Source program called the DCL Technology Demonstrator programme and the UK has developed and entered into service the S2170 Surface Ship Torpedo Defence system.

An improved torpedo countermeasure system called the AN/SLQ-61 Lightweight Tow (LWT) Torpedo Defense Mission Module (TDMM) is lighter than the AN/SLQ-25 and has a different tow profile, making it more suited for small combatant warships operating in littoral environments. The LWT is a modular, digitally controlled soft kill countermeasure decoy that can defend ships against wake-homing, acoustic homing, and wire-guided torpedoes.

References

External links

Sonar decoys
Anti-submarine warfare
Military electronics of the United States
Nixie